Dragan Mićanović (born 30 September 1970) is a Serbian actor. He had roles in the films Layer Cake (2004), The White Countess (2005) and RocknRolla (2008). Mićanović played his first role abroad in Hamlet at the Globe Theatre''.

Personal life
Mićanović was married to Serbian actress Ana Sofrenović and they have two daughters, Iva and Lena. The family lived in London but they continued to work in Serbia and the Balkans. They divorced in November 2011.

Filmography

Serbian dubs

References

External links
 

1970 births
20th-century Serbian male actors
21st-century Serbian male actors
Serbian male film actors
Serbian male stage actors
Serbian male television actors
Living people
People from Loznica
Serbian male Shakespearean actors
Miloš Žutić Award winners
Zoran Radmilović Award winners
Dr. Branivoj Đorđević Award winners